Edward Richard William Stanley, 19th Earl of Derby,  (born 10 October 1962) is a British hereditary peer and landowner.

He was a member of the House of Lords from 1994 to 1999.

Activities
Edward Stanley (informally "Teddy") otherwise Lord Derby was born to Hugh Stanley (1926–1971) and his wife Rose Stanley (née Birch). He lives at Knowsley Hall near Liverpool, and also has a residence in London.

Stanley inherited the earldom of Derby and other family titles in 1994, on the death of his uncle. He also inherited the Knowsley Estate, the Knowsley Safari Park and Stanley House Stud on Hatchfield Farm. He is president of the Liverpool Chamber of Commerce, serves as a member of the University of Liverpool Council (receiving an honorary doctorate (Hon. LLD) from the Liverpool University in 2008) and is one of seven trustees of the foundation which funds bursaries to Cameron House pre-prep and prep school in the Royal Borough of Kensington and Chelsea, London, where fees exceed £16,000 per year. Lord Derby was appointed a deputy lieutenant of Merseyside in 1999, serving alongside Frank Field and Mark Blundell among others.

Family
Lord Derby married The Honourable Caroline Neville, a daughter of Robin Neville, 10th Baron Braybrooke, on 21 October 1995 at the Church of St. Mary the Virgin in Saffron Walden. The couple have three children:
 Lady Henrietta Mary Rose Stanley (b. 1997)
 Edward John Robin Stanley, Lord Stanley, heir apparent to the earldom (b. 1998)
 The Honourable Oliver Henry Hugh Stanley (b. 2002).
Lord Derby is the great-great-grandson of Frederick Stanley, 16th Earl of Derby who served as Governor General of Canada and gifted the country the Stanley Cup.

The elder son, Lord Stanley, is a godson of Prince Andrew, Duke of York, and was Page of Honour to Queen Elizabeth II between 2008 and 2012, appearing in three Garter services and four State Openings of Parliament. He held the Garter around the leg of Prince William during his installation as 1000th Knight of the Garter.

Knowsley Estate
The Knowsley Estate has residential properties in the rural parishes of Knowsley, Eccleston, Rainford, Bickerstaffe and Ormskirk. It also offers commercial properties as part of the Stanley Grange Business Village, converted from a range of Victorian farm buildings on the estate and opened in June 2013.

The Grade II* listed Knowsley Hall and surrounding 2,500 acres of parkland have also been used as locations for several television programmes and films including Boys from the Blackstuff – 'Yosser's Story' (1982), Apparitions (2008), The Liver Birds (2007) as well as television soap operas, Hollyoaks and Coronation Street. In 2008, the house received a five-star gold rating for accommodation from inspectors at VisitEngland, the only stately home to be so rated. In 2010, Lord Derby announced his 'Green' policies for the estate, which included conservation and generation of efficient energy usage.

Hatchfield Farm and thoroughbred horse racing
Stanley's maternal grandmother, Catherine, was a well-known racehorse trainer in Wiltshire notably College House, Lambourn, from where she sent out The Schweppes Gold Trophy winner Ra Nova, among others. The Epsom Derby was named after the 12th Earl of Derby while The Oaks was named after the 12th Earl's house near Epsom. The Derby family can trace its horse racing heritage back to the 5th Earl of Derby in the sixteenth century.

Stanley usually has one or sometimes two horses in training each year from Hatchfield stud farm, managed by his brother, Peter Stanley. Home to a small number of broodmares, Lord Derby's policy is to sell his colts and race the fillies. The Earl currently owns Ouija Board, winner of seven The Group/Grade 1 races, including The Oaks, Irish Oaks and Breeders' Cup Filly & Mare Turf in 2004, and the last-named race again in 2006. She also won the Prince of Wales's Stakes at Royal Ascot in June 2006. She was third in the Japan Cup following that last win, and was retired after going lame before her intended final start in the Hong Kong Vase at Sha Tin in December 2006. Ouija Board won over three million pounds in prize money. The Earl has published a book about her, Ouija Board: A Mare in a Million.

Stanley's proposal to build 1,200 houses and a large industrial estate on historic studland at Hatchfield Farm in Newmarket, Suffolk, was met with opposition from local residents, businesses and the area's largest employers, including Tattersalls, the Jockey Club, Newmarket Racecourse, Newmarket's elected councillors, leading trainers and the local resident group Save Historic Newmarket.

See also 

 Baron Stanley of Alderley
 Stanley baronets

References

External links

www.hereditarypeers.com
www.tatler.com

1962 births
Living people
British racehorse owners and breeders
Deputy Lieutenants of Merseyside
Edward
19
People educated at Ludgrove School
Derby